This is a list of Panjabi films of 1974.

List of films

External links 
 Punjabi films at the Internet Movie Database

1974
Punjabi